Suprabhatha is a 1988 Indian Kannada-language romantic drama film directed, written and filmed by Dinesh Babu, making his debut as a director. The film stars Vishnuvardhan and Suhasini in lead roles, along with Srividya, Maanu and Vijay Kashi in other supporting roles. The film revolves around the relationship between the mute Hema (Suhasini) and Vijay Kumar portrayed by Vishnuvardhan, a man with a stammering problem. The film explores the issue of relationships with the handicapped, revealing the emotional divide b/w their worlds.

The film was produced by Prabha Raj under the banner of Suryaprabha Films. The film features original songs composed by music duo Rajan–Nagendra, with lyrics were written by Chi. Udaya Shankar (who also wrote the dialogs of the film). The film was presented by Charuhasan. The film was edited by B. Lenin and V. T. Vijayan in their Kannada film debut.

The film upon release was met with widespread critical acclaim was declared a musical blockbuster. The film created a record by winning eight different awards for a single film in 1988. This was the first such film to have won multiple awards in Kannada cinema. Dinesh Babu was awarded with the Best Cinematographer at the Karnataka State Awards in 1989 and Filmfare Best Director award in 1988. Vishnuvardhan received multiple awards for his performance in the film including the Filmfare Best Actor award and the Cinema Express Awards Best Actor, while Suhasini won the Filmfare Award for Best Actress - Kannada.

Plot
Vijay Kumar (Vishnuvardhan), who suffers from stammering problem, lives his life alone in a beautiful valley as petrol bunk owner. He is later joined by a mute Hema (Suhasini) & her brother, Sundereshwar (Maanu) who visits the resort as a hobby to watch migrating birds.

Cast
 Vishnuvardhan as Vijay Kumar
 Suhasini as Hema
 Srividya as Vijay's Sister
 Maanu as Sundareshwar, Hema's Brother
 Vijay Kashi
 Anand Kumar
 Baby Mala
 Rajendra Singh

Soundtrack
All songs were composed by Rajan–Nagendra, with lyrics by Chi. Udaya Shankar. The soundtrack was hugely successful upon release.

 "Ee Hrudaya Haadide" - S. P. Balasubrahmanyam
 "Nanna Haadu Nannadu" - S. P. Balasubrahmanyam
 "Cheluve Nanna Cheluve" - S. P. Balasubrahmanyam, K. S. Chithra
 "Aralida Aase" - S. P. Balasubrahmanyam, K. S. Chithra
 "Ee Hrudaya Haadide" - K. S. Chithra
 "Cheluva Nanna Cheluva" - K. S. Chithra

Awards

 Karnataka State Film Award for Best Cinematographer - Dinesh Babu
 Filmfare Award for Best Director - Kannada - Dinesh Babu
 Filmfare Award for Best Actor - Kannada - Vishnuvardhan
 Filmfare Award for Best Actress - Kannada - Suhasini
 Cinema Express Awards Best Film - Prabha Raj 
 Cinema Express Awards Best Actor - Vishnuvardhan
 Cinema Express Awards Best Actress - Suhasini
 Aragini Readers' Award
 Cine Express Award
 Tarangini Berkley Award
 Indira Pratishtana National Award
 Kannada Film Fan's Association Award
 Kaladevi Award(Chennai)
 It screened at 12th IFFI mainstream section.

References

External links
 

1988 films
1980s Kannada-language films
Indian romantic drama films
Films scored by Rajan–Nagendra
Films directed by Dinesh Baboo
1988 directorial debut films
1988 romantic drama films